Outlaws of the Rio Grande is a 1941 American Western film directed by Sam Newfield and written by George H. Plympton. The film stars Tim McCoy, Virginia Carpenter, Charles King, Ralph Peters, Karl Hackett and Rex Lease. The film was released on February 26, 1941, by Producers Releasing Corporation.

Plot

Cast          
Tim McCoy as Tim Barton
Virginia Carpenter as Rita Alvarado
Charles King as Trigger
Ralph Peters as Monty
Karl Hackett as Marlow
Rex Lease as Luke
Felipe Turich as Pancho 
Frank Ellis as Brett
Kenne Duncan as Bob Day 
Thornton Edwards as Alvarado
Joe Dominguez as Castro

References

External links
 

1941 films
American Western (genre) films
1941 Western (genre) films
Producers Releasing Corporation films
Films directed by Sam Newfield
American black-and-white films
Films with screenplays by George H. Plympton
1940s English-language films
1940s American films